This is a list of films produced in the Telugu film industry in India in 2010.

Box office

January–June

July–December

Dubbed films

References 

2010 in Indian cinema
Lists of 2010 films by country or language
2010